Chanibeh may refer to:
 Chanibeh 1
 Chanibeh 2